Georg Bätzing (born 13 April 1961) is a German Catholic theologian who has been Bishop of Limburg since 2016 and chairman of the German Bishops' Conference since March 2020.

Early life and career 
Bätzing was born in Kirchen and grew up in Niederfischbach. He was an altar boy, sang in the church choir and served as an organist there. After his Abitur, he entered the major seminary of the Diocese of Trier. He studied theology and philosophy at Trier University and Freiburg University, graduating in 1985.

As deacon he was assigned to Sankt Wendel. He was ordained a priest in Trier on 18 July 1987 by Bishop . He then was vice-rector (Subregens) of the Trier major seminary until 1996. That same year he received his doctorate and became rector (Regens) of the seminary. One of his functions was the organization of the Heilig-Rock-Wallfahrt in Trier in 2012, a pilgrimage to the most important relic of the Trier Cathedral, the seamless robe of Jesus, which was displayed in the cathedral from 13 April 2012 for the first time since 1996.

On 1 November 2012, Bätzing was appointed vicar general of the Diocese of Trier.

Bishop
In 2016, he was elected by the Limburg Cathedral chapter (Domkapitel) to succeed Franz-Peter Tebartz-van Elst as bishop of Limburg. He was appointed by Pope Francis on 1 July 2016. He was consecrated by Archbishop Rainer Woelki of Cologne on 18 September 2016.

Since 3 March 2020, Bätzing has been chairman of the German Bishops' Conference.

Positions 
In 2019, Bätzing said that he would support a voluntary celibacy of priests. Bätzing supports the ordination of women in the Catholic church.

Against the orthodox Catholic stance, he has supported the secular legalisation of civic marriage between homosexual people who are "faithful in their relationship".

Bätzing is a proponent of intercommunion with protestants and he gives the Holy Eucharist to any protestant who asks for it.

In 2021 he, told KNA on that he was “not happy” that the Vatican had now decided to participate so determinedly in the debate on blessings for homosexual couples. He added that “It suggests that one wants to end the ongoing controversial theological discussions [on the subject] in various parts of the World Church, including in Germany, as soon as possible,”

In March 2022, in an interview with Bunte, he stated that sex outside of marriage is not a sin and that same-sex relationships are "OK if it's done in fidelity and responsibility".

In May 2022, Bätzing expressed disappointment that Pope Francis had not changed the teachings of the Catholic Church regarding homosexuality and women's ordination. Citing the public departure of Andreas Sturm, the former vicar general of the Diocese of Speyer who had left the Roman Catholic Church to join the German Old Catholic Church, Bätzing said that he too would consider leaving the church if he "got the impression that nothing would ever change."

In November 2022, Bätzing spoke at a news conference at the end of a week of talks between Pope Francis and Vatican officials on one side, and all of Germany's bishops on the other. Their focus was on the progressive Synodal Path, a series of conferences of the Catholic Church in Germany to discuss a range of contemporary theological and organizational questions concerning the Catholic Church, as well as possible reactions to the sexual abuse crisis in the Catholic Church in Germany. "As far as the ordination of women is concerned, for example, (the Vatican's) view is very clear, that the question is closed. But the question exists and it has to elaborated and discussed," Bätzing said. "All these questions are on the table (of the German Synodal Path) and all attempts of cancel them will not have success," he said. "Popes have tried to say the question (of women priests) is closed but the fact is that the question exists. Many young women say 'a church that refuses all of this cannot be my church in the long run.'"

Publications 
Doctoral dissertation:

Spiritual writings and published homilies
 Die Eucharistie als Opfer der Kirche (1986)
 Suchbewegungen (2000)
 Helfer im Einsatz Gottes (2001)
 Der Kreuzweg Jesu Christi (2003)
 Bleib doch bei uns, Herr (2005)
 Das Leben ausloten (2006)
 Gott der kleinen Leute (2007)
 Es gibt keine größere Liebe (2007)
 Nachgefragt. Hilfen zum Verständnis des christlichen Glaubens (2008)
 Beten üben. Anleitung zu einer christlichen Gebetspraxis (2009)
 Das Trierer Christusgebet. Entstehung, Auslegung und Praxis eines Elementes bistumseigener Gebetstradition (2010)
 Jesus Christus, Heiland und Erlöser. Impulse auf dem Weg der Erlösung (2011)

References

External links 
 Georg Bätzing: "heraus gerufen" – anders als erwartet / Georg Bätzing zu seiner Ernennung zum Bischof von Limburg (in German) Diocese of Trier
 Georg Bätzing Focus

1961 births
Living people
21st-century German Roman Catholic bishops
Roman Catholic bishops of Limburg
University of Freiburg alumni
People from Kirchen
University of Trier alumni
21st-century Roman Catholic bishops in Germany